The Zudar is a peninsula on the German Baltic Sea island of Rügen. It is about 18 square kilometres in area and sharply divided.

Location 
The peninsula lies between the bay of Schoritzer Wiek, the lagoon of Rügischer Bodden (the northern part of the  Greifswalder Bodden) and the southwestern entrance to the Strelasund.

The Zudar also has the southernmost point of Rügen, the Palmer Ort

History 

Until 12 June 2004 the municipality of Zudar that lies on the peninsula was independent. From that date it was incorporated into the town of Garz. This also affected the former Zudar parishes of Freudenberg, Foßberg, Glewitz, Grabow, Losentitz, Maltzien, Poppelvitz and Zicker.

In 1854, Max Hofmeier, who was later a gynaecologist and head of the University of Würzburg, was born on Zudar.

Sights 

 St. Laurence's Church (St.-Laurentius-Kirche)
 1963 farmworkers' houses (Landarbeiterhäuser)

Transport 

The Glewitz Ferry – the second most important link between Rügen and the mainland after the fixed Strelasund Bridge – runs between Stahlbrode and the Zudar.

References 

Peninsulas of Mecklenburg-Western Pomerania
Peninsulas of the Baltic Sea
Vorpommern-Rügen
Geography of Rügen